Mount Thor can refer to:

 Mount Thor, Nunavut, Canada
 Mount Thor (Alaska)
 Mount Thor (Antarctica)
 Thor (volcano), on Jupiter's moon Io

See also
 Thor (disambiguation)